Fangshan may refer to the following locations:

Fangshan District, Beijing
Fangshan County, Lüliang, Shanxi
Fangshan, Pingtung, township in Pingtung County, Taiwan
Towns
Fangshan, Jiangsu, subdivision of Donghai County, Jiangsu
Fangshan, Liaoning, subdivision of Heishan County, Liaoning
Fangshan, Shandong 
Written as ""
, subdivision of Yuzhou, Henan
, subdivision of Jiangyang District, Luzhou, Sichuan